The year 1954 in archaeology involved some significant events.

Explorations

Excavations
 Mixco Viejo, Guatemala Musée d'Homme project under the direction of Henri Lehmann starts (continues through 1967).
 Neolithic-era site of Ashkelon discovered and excavated by French archaeologist Jean Perrot.
 Excavations at Beycesultan by Seton Lloyd of the British Institute of Archaeology in Ankara begin (continue to 1959).
 Excavations at Filitosa, Corsica, begin.
 Excavations at Nagarjunakonda by the Archaeological Survey of India begin (continue to 1960).
 Excavations at Nevasa, Maharashtra, begin (continue to 1956).
 Excavations of the London Mithraeum conducted under the direction of W. F. Grimes.
 Systematic excavations at Niah Caves begin under the direction of the Sarawak Museum.

Finds
 September 18 - Marble head of Mithras from London Mithraeum unearthed in Walbrook Square by W. F. Grimes's excavation.
 Panlongcheng Erligang culture site in China discovered.
 Khufu ship discovered in Giza pyramid complex by Kamal el-Mallakh.
 Cape Gelidonya shipwreck discovered.

Miscellaneous
 Sir Mortimer Wheeler is named Television Personality of the Year in the U.K. due to his contributions to Animal, Vegetable, Mineral?

Publications
 Maurice Beresford - The Lost Villages of England.
 R. Allen Brown - English Medieval Castles.
 Grahame Clark - Excavations at Star Carr, an early Mesolithic site at Seamer near Scarborough, Yorkshire.
 V. E. Nash-Williams - The Roman Frontier in Wales.
 Stuart Piggott - The Neolithic Cultures of the British Isles: a study of the stone-using agricultural communities of Britain in the second millennium B.C.

Births
 July 1 - William Rathje, American archaeologist and garbologist (d. 2012)
 Barbara Tsakirgis, American classical archaeologist (d. 2019)

Deaths
 March 6 - Sir John Myres, English archaeologist of Cyprus (b. 1869)
 April 10 - Ludwig Curtius, German Classical archaeologist (b. 1874)
 July 16 - Henri Frankfort, Dutch-born Egyptologist (b. 1897)
 October 5 - Alfred Tozzer, American Mesoamerican archaeologist (b. 1877)

References

Archaeology
Archaeology
Archaeology by year